Dharmapuri is a 2006 Indian Tamil-language action drama film written and directed by Perarasu and produced by A. M. Rathnam. It stars Vijayakanth and Raai Laxmi, while Manivannan, Raj Kapoor, Bobby,  Vijayakumar, and M. S. Bhaskar play supporting roles. The songs were composed by Srikanth Deva. The film opened on 20 October 2006 to mixed positive review from critics and become a super hit.

Plot
The movie is set in a remote village in Dharmapuri, known for making dolls from clay. It is the livelihood of people in the village. A man named Mokkaiyan, along with his sons Silandhi Karuppu and Peruchali Karuppu, grabs the land and gives it on a lease for a local MLA Konda Mookan. Humiliated and agitated, the villagers decide to put an end to their shenanigans. They set off in search of Sivaraman, the son of Meiyappan, who once strived for the welfare of the village and later was forced to flee the village due to Mokkaiyan's family. They finally spot Sivaraman in Rameshwaram, where he works tirelessly for the uplift of the people. They convince him to return to the village and teach Mokkaiyan and his family a lesson. Enters Sivaraman on a mission. He comes across Valarmathi and falls in love with her. Meanwhile, he also embarks on a mission to teach the baddies a lesson.

Cast

Soundtrack
The music was composed by Srikanth Deva and released by An Ak Audio. All lyrics were written by Perarasu.

Production
After the success of Thirupathi, Perarasu announced a project called "Pandigai" with S. J. Suryah but the project was cancelled and he announced his next project "Dharmapuri" with Vijayakanth in 2006 since Producer A M Rathnam expressed his desire of Perarasu directing a film for him. Incidentally it was Rathnam who suggested Vijayakanth's name for the film. When Rathnam and captain heard the ‘one liner’ of the movie, they both liked it instantly and thus ‘Dharmapuri’ was born without even a heroine. Crew wanted Nayanthara as heroine but she rejected as the film had political overtones instead Lakshmi Rai was selected. while shooting at Srirangam, Vijayakanth slapped a person which caused a stir but he clarified on media that it was his old friend. A song sequence for the movie was shot at a village called Sarukani near Devakkottai.

Release
Indiaglitz wrote: "Perarasu has dished out a movie that would certainly appease front-benchers. A commercial pot-boiler, the movie will be lapped by Vijayakanth's fans. Sure to make it big in rural centres, the movie also has enough stunt sequences for action-lovers". Sify wrote: "Dharmapuri is pure DMDK propaganda machinery working overtime. Perarasu who has written the story, screenplay, dialogue, lyrics and directed the film has given it a commercial coating – songs, fights, punch lines and a bit of glamour. As a political propaganda film, Perarasu has done a fairly decent job as he has worked the script to suit Captain’s screen image".

References

External links
 

2006 films
Films shot in Tiruchirappalli
2000s Tamil-language films
Films directed by Perarasu
2000s masala films
Films scored by Srikanth Deva
2006 action films